Philip Mangano (born Filippo Mangano; ; April 13, 1898 – April 19, 1951) was an Italian-born caporegime and second consigliere in what was then the Mangano crime family in New York City and reigned consigliere for 20 years between 1931 and 1951 when his brother, Vincent, was boss.

Mangano was involved with the International Longshoremen's Association and in New York City politics.

In 1923, Mangano was indicted on murder charges, but was never convicted.

Death
Mangano disappeared on April 19, 1951. That same day, a woman in a fishing boat discovered Philip Mangano's body in a marshland area of Jamaica Bay in Brooklyn while she had been walking through the tall grass. Mangano had been shot three times; once in the neck and twice in the face. He, along with his brother Vincent, who disappeared that same day, are believed to have been murdered on the orders of family underboss Albert Anastasia in Brooklyn in 1951. No one was ever arrested in the Mangano murders, but it was widely assumed that Anastasia had them killed.

See also
List of solved missing person cases
List of unsolved murders

References

External links 
 

1898 births
1950s missing person cases
1951 deaths
Deaths by firearm in Brooklyn
Gambino crime family
Italian emigrants to the United States
Murdered American gangsters of Sicilian descent
Gangsters from Palermo
People murdered in New York City
Male murder victims
Unsolved murders in the United States